Risca may refer to:

Risca, a town in Wales, United Kingdom
Risca, a character in Terry Brooks's Shannara series
Rişca, a village in Baia de Criş Commune, Hunedoara County, Romania